Robert Arcedekne (died 1768) was a planter in Jamaica who sat in the House of Assembly for Saint Ann Parish. He owned over 200 slaves on his plantation in Saint Mary Parish where he also lived.

References 

1768 deaths
Planters from the British West Indies
Jamaican politicians
British slave owners
Members of the House of Assembly of Jamaica
Year of birth missing
18th-century Jamaican people